Mount Olympus is an unincorporated community in Washington Township, Gibson County, Indiana. It was formerly called Ennes. A post office called Ennes operated from 1879 until 1883.

Geography

References

Unincorporated communities in Gibson County, Indiana
Unincorporated communities in Indiana